Patty Van Acker (born 21 October 1976) is a former tennis player from Belgium.

Biography
A right-handed player from Bruges, Van Acker turned professional at the age of 18.

She made her WTA Tour main-draw singles debut at the 1999 Internazionali di Palermo, as a lucky loser from the qualifiers. At the 2000 Antwerp Open, she featured as a wildcard in the main draw. In her career, she won eight singles titles and five doubles titles ITF Circuit. She reached a highest singles ranking of 146 in the world.

Van Acker now works as a tennis trainer at the Challenger Tennis Academy in Aartrijke.

ITF Circuit finals

Singles: 14 (8–6)

Doubles: 13 (5–8)

References

External links
 
 

1976 births
Living people
Belgian female tennis players
Sportspeople from Bruges
20th-century Belgian women
21st-century Belgian women